The women's pentathlon at the 2010 IAAF World Indoor Championships was held at the ASPIRE Dome on 13 March.

Medalists

Records

Qualification standards
 the three best athletes from the 2009 Outdoor Lists (as at 31 December 2009) limited to a maximum of one per country and
 the three best athletes form the 2010 Indoor Lists during (as at 22 February 2010)
 two athletes which may be invited at the discretion of the IAAF
In total no more than two male and two female athletes from any one Member will be invited.
Upon refusals or cancellations, the invitations shall be extended to the next ranked athletes in the same lists respecting the above conditions.
Members whose athletes are invited as above will receive additional quota places accordingly

Schedule

Results

60 metres hurdles

High jump

Shot put

Long jump

800 metres

Final standings

References
60 metres hurdles Results
High jump Results
Shot put Results
Long jump Results
800 metres Results
Summary Results

Pentathlon
Combined events at the World Athletics Indoor Championships
2010 in women's athletics